Maryborough–Hervey Bay Road is a continuous  road route in the Fraser Coast region of Queensland, Australia. The entire route is signed as State Route 57. It is a state-controlled regional road (number 163).

Route description
The road commences as Gympie  Road at an intersection with the Bruce Highway (A1) in Tinana. It runs north-east through Tinana before crossing the Mary River and entering Maryborough. It continues to the north-east on Ferry Street, passing exits to Maryborough–Biggenden Road and Maryborough–Cooloola Road. It turns south-east on Walker Street and north-east on John Street as it passes through the Maryborough CBD. It then turns north on Saltwater Creek Road, where it passes the Maryborough Airport and leaves Maryborough. It passes through the locality of St Helens, crosses Saltwater Creek, and enters , where the road name changes to Maryborough–Hervey Bay Road. 

Tourist Drive 12
Tourist Drive 12 follows the road from Tinana to Urangan, with two major deviations. In Maryborough the drive includes many local attractions away from the through route on both sides of the road. At the Walligan / Sunshine Acres midpoint it turns into Booral Road and follows it to Urangan. To avoid additional complexity the tourist drive is not shown in the major intersections table.

History

Pastoral leases were taken up in the Fraser Coast Region from 1843, and European settlement of what is now Maryborough began in 1847. It was declared a port of entry in 1859 and soon became the major port of entry for immigrants to Queensland. Dalgaroom pastoral run was established in the Hervey Bay area in 1855. Timbergetting began in the district in the mid 1860's, resulting in cleared tracts of land suitable for crop farming. In 1887,  of land were resumed from the Toogoom pastoral run for the establishment of small farms. The land was offered for selection on 17 April 1887. The opening of new farms on the southern shore of Hervey Bay led to the development of roads in the area.

By the mid 1860's five settlers had taken up leases along the coastal strip from Point Vernon to Urangan. A small village soon developed on each, with wealthy businessmen buying blocks for holiday homes. In 1883 two sugar juice mills opened near Pialba, which became a small town. Due to its central location in the developing community and its suitability as a port for barges transferring smaller items from ship to shore, Pialba became the administrative centre of the Hervey Bay region. This led to the need for a road to transport larger quantities of products and materials to and from Maryborough, and also requests for a railway line. The road was completed quickly, but a railway did not arrive until 1896. Meanwhile, further road improvements had been undertaken.

The railway was extended to Urangan in 1913, and the Urangan pier was completed in 1916. The presence of a deep-water port led to a substantial increase in the number of wheeled vehicles negotiating the streets between Pialba and Urangan. This problem was ultimately solved by the construction of a new road, on open land to the south of the coastal villages, in conjunction with the construction of the Urangan Boat Harbour in the 1960's.

Upgrade

Intersection upgrade
A project to upgrade the intersection with Pialba-Burrum Heads Road, at a cost of $44.1 million, was to be completed by the end of 2022.

Major intersections
All distances are from Google Maps.
The entire road is in the Fraser Coast local government area.

See also

 List of road routes in Queensland
 List of numbered roads in Queensland
 Hervey Bay (Queensland), the body of water
 Pialba Memorial Cenotaph

Notes

References

Roads in Queensland